IBM Master Inventor is an honorific title bestowed by the IBM Corporation to a qualifying employee. The qualification and appointment to Master Inventor is governed by the value to IBM of an inventor's contribution to the patent portfolio, and through defensive publication. IBM weighs many aspects of an inventor's contributions, including impact of invention through licensing, inclusion in product, and percentage of patents with a measurable impact. IBM also considers an individual's contribution to the inventing community inside IBM, whether by acting as a patent reviewer, or providing feedback and guidance to new inventors.

IBM Master Inventor is a privilege and title afforded to IBM inventors who have exhibited sustained invention activity. Each Master Inventor is reviewed every three years to ensure they maintain invention and mentoring activity. To be selected as an IBM Master Inventor, an inventor must (1) create valuable inventions resulting in patents and defensive publications that are in line with IBM’s criteria, and (2) support the IBM patent process such as by coaching other inventors, serving on invention development teams (IDTs), and helping the IBM IP Law organization in other ways.
The IBM Master Inventor program recognizes IBM’s leaders in the patent community. The objectives of the program are:
      Recognize model inventors who have a sustained personal history of invention, mentorship, and assisting IP law
      Create a community of Master Inventors to collectively improve awareness of IP importance & improve IBM's IP Process
      Support a climate of innovation to enable IBM's IP strategy of freedom of leadership
      Create role models that advocate IBM’s innovation to clients and external stakeholders

Nominees to the Master Inventor program must have contributed to IBM patent process through invention participation and least two of the remaining three areas:
 Demonstrate mastery of the process through active invention participation with patents which are filed and issued with the USPTO
 Leverage their mastery of patent knowledge as a role model by:
  Mentoring new inventors who have ideas, but who are unfamiliar with the process
  Helping educate inexperienced inventors in understanding the IP process and how to effectively document and submit inventions
  Pro-actively arranging and leading patent mining sessions
  Being a catalyst for innovation and invention
 Actively contribute in the IP creation process by participation in Invention Development Teams (IDTs) and identification of technology areas and projects that are strategic for IBM’s patent portfolio
 Serve as a resource for IP Law in areas of patent prosecution & patent licensing
 Identify themselves as an IBM Master Inventor when working with clients and external organizations to serve as a:
  reminder of our innovation heritage
  conversation starter on IBM’s innovation practices

According to one Master Inventor  the citation reads:  Stories about a few master inventors appear in IBM web pages and external media.

References